Newtown is a village and district of the town of Mountain Ash, within the Cynon Valley in Rhondda Cynon Taf, Wales.

Geography
The village is located to the east of Mountain Ash town centre, bounded by the River Cynon to the west, and the large village of Caegarw to the north.

Gallery

References

Villages in Rhondda Cynon Taf
Mountain Ash, Rhondda Cynon Taf